"The Californian Ideology" is a 1995 essay by English media theorists Richard Barbrook and Andy Cameron of the University of Westminster.  Barbrook describes it as a "critique of dotcom neoliberalism". In the essay, Barbrook and Cameron argue that the rise of networking technologies in Silicon Valley in the 1990s was linked to American neoliberalism and a paradoxical hybridization of beliefs from the political left and right in the form of hopeful technological determinism.

The original essay was published in Mute magazine in 1995 and later appeared on the nettime Internet mailing list for debate.  A final version was published in Science as Culture in 1996.  The critique has since been revised in several different versions and languages.

Andrew Leonard of Salon called Barbrook & Cameron's work "one of the most penetrating critiques of neo-conservative digital hypesterism yet published."

Critique

During the 1990s, members of the entrepreneurial class in the information technology industry in Silicon Valley vocally promoted an ideology that combined the ideas of Marshall McLuhan with elements of radical individualism, libertarianism, and neoliberal economics, using publications like Wired magazine to promulgate their ideas.  This ideology mixed New Left and New Right beliefs together based on their shared interest in anti-statism, the counterculture of the 1960s, and techno-utopianism.

Proponents believed that in a post-industrial, post-capitalist, knowledge-based economy, the exploitation of information and knowledge would drive growth and wealth creation while diminishing the older power structures of the state in favor of connected individuals in virtual communities.

Critics contend that the Californian Ideology has strengthened the power of corporations over the individual and has increased social stratification, and remains distinctly Americentric.  Barbrook argues that members of the digerati who adhere to the Californian Ideology, embrace a form of reactionary modernism.  According to Barbrook, "American neo-liberalism seems to have successfully achieved the contradictory aims of reactionary modernism: economic progress and social immobility. Because the long-term goal of liberating everyone will never be reached, the short-term rule of the digerati can last forever."

Influences
According to Fred Turner, sociologist Thomas Streeter of the University of Vermont notes that the Californian Ideology appeared as part of a pattern of Romantic individualism with Stewart Brand as a key influence.  Adam Curtis connects the origins of the Californian Ideology to the Objectivist philosophy of Ayn Rand.

Reception
While in general agreement with Barbrook & Cameron's central thesis, David Hudson of Rewired takes issue with their portrayal of Wired magazine's position as representative of every viewpoint in the industry. "What Barbrook is saying between the lines is that the people with their hands on the reins of power in all of the wired world...are guided by an utterly skewed philosophical construct."  Hudson maintains that there is not one, but a multitude of different ideologies at work.

Andrew Leonard of Salon calls the essay "a lucid lambasting of right-wing libertarian digerati domination of the Internet" and "one of the most penetrating critiques of neo-conservative digital hypesterism yet published."  Leonard also notes the "vitriolic" response from Louis Rossetto, former editor and publisher of Wired magazine. Rossetto's rebuttal, also published in Mute, criticized it as showing "a profound ignorance of economics".

Gary Kamiya, also of Salon, recognized the validity of the main points in the essay, but like Rossetto, Kamiya attacked Barbrook & Cameron's "ludicrous academic-Marxist claim that high-tech libertarianism somehow represents a recrudescence of racism."

Architecture historian Kazys Varnelis of Columbia University found that in spite of the privatization advocated by the Californian Ideology, the economic growth of Silicon Valley and California were "made possible only due to exploitation of the immigrant poor and defense funding...government subsidies for corporations and exploitation of non-citizen poor: a model for future administrations."

In the 2011 documentary, All Watched Over by Machines of Loving Grace, Curtis concludes that the Californian Ideology failed to live up to its claims:

See also
 Carmen Hermosillo
 Corporatocracy
 Cyber-utopianism
 Dark Enlightenment
 Dot-com company
 Intellectual property
 Libertarian transhumanism
 Surveillance capitalism
 Technocracy
 Technocapitalism
 Technolibertarianism
 The Venus Project

Notes

References
 Barbrook, Richard. Andy Cameron. (1996) [1995] "The Californian Ideology". Science as Culture 6.1 (1996): 44–72.
 Barbrook, Richard. Andy Cameron (1995) Basic Banalities.
 
 Barbrook, Richard. (2000) [1999]. "Cyber-Communism: How The Americans Are Superseding Capitalism In Cyberspace". Science as Culture. 9 (1), 5-40.
 .
 Borsook, Paulina. (2000).  Cyberselfish: A Critical Romp Through the Terribly Libertarian Culture of High Tech. PublicAffairs. .
 Curtis, Adam (2011). "Love and Power". All Watched Over by Machines of Loving Grace.  BBC.
 Hudson, David. (June 24, 1996). "The Other Californians". Rewired: Journal of a Strained Net.
 Kamiya, Gary. (January 20, 1997). "Smashing the state: The strange rise of libertarianism". Salon.com.
 Leonard, Andrew. (September 10, 1999). "The Cybercommunist Manifesto". Salon.com.
 May, Christopher. (2002). The Information Society: A Sceptical View. Wiley-Blackwell. .
 Ouellet, Maxime. (2010). "Cybernetic capitalism and the global information society: From the global panopticon to a 'brand' new world". In Jacqueline Best and Matthew Paterson,  Cultural Political Economy. 10. Taylor & Francis. .
 Rossetto, Louis. (1996). "19th Century Nostrums are not Solutions to 21st Century Problems". Mute. 1 (4).
 Streeter, Thomas. (1999). 'That Deep Romantic Chasm': Libertarianism, Neoliberalism, and the Computer Culture.  In Andrew Calabrese and Jean-Claude Burgelman, eds., Communication, Citizenship, and Social Policy: Re-Thinking the Limits of the Welfare State. Rowman & Littlefield, 49–64.
 Turner, Fred. (2006). From Counterculture to Cyberculture: Stewart Brand, the Whole Earth Network, and the Rise of Digital Utopianism. University Of Chicago Press. .
 Varnelis, Kazys. (2009). "Complexity and Contradiction in Infrastructure ".  Ph.D. Lecture Series. Columbia Graduate School of Architecture, Planning, and Preservation.

Further reading
 Barbrook, Richard. (2007). Imaginary Futures: From Thinking Machines to the Global Village.  Pluto. .
 Dyson, Esther. George Gilder, George Keyworth, Alvin Toffler. (1994). "Cyberspace and the American Dream: A Magna Carta for the Knowledge Age". Future Insight. Progress & Freedom Foundation.
 Flew, Terry. (2002). "The 'New Empirics' in Internet Studies and Comparative Internet Policy". In Fibreculture Conference, 5–8 December, 5–8 December. Melbourne.
 Gere, Charlie. (2002). Digital Culture. Reaktion Books. .
 Halberstadt, Mitchell. (January 20, 1997). "Beyond California". Rewired: Journal of a Strained Net.
 Hudson, David. (1997). Rewired. Macmillan Technical Pub. .
 Lovink, Geert. (2009) [2002]. Dynamics of Critical Internet Culture (1994-2001). Amsterdam: Institute of Network Cultures. .
 Pearce, Celia. (1996). The California Ideology: An Insider's View. Mute. 1 (4).

External links

 The Californian Ideology at the Hypermedia Research Centre
 The Californian Ideology revised SaC version

Ideologies
California culture
Computing culture
Technological utopianism
Controversies within libertarianism
Criticisms of economics
1995 essays
Transhumanism